The 1997–98 NBA season was the Lakers' 50th season in the National Basketball Association, and 38th in the city of Los Angeles. During the off-season, the Lakers signed free agents Rick Fox, and three-point specialist Jon Barry. Second-year shooting guard, and last season's Slam Dunk champion Kobe Bryant emerged as a star in his second season, playing an increased role as the team's sixth man, averaging 15.4 points per game off the bench, while being selected to start in the 1998 NBA All-Star Game at the age of 19, which was his first All-Star appearance; Bryant scored 18 points in 22 minutes, as the Western Conference lost to the Eastern Conference, 135–114. Joining him on the Western Conference All-Star roster were teammates Shaquille O'Neal, Eddie Jones and Nick Van Exel. Bryant also finished in second place in Sixth Man of the Year voting behind Danny Manning of the Phoenix Suns.

The Lakers got off to a fast start to the season winning their first eleven games, before losing O'Neal to a strained stomach muscle that forced him to sit out 20 games. In his absence, the Lakers went 13–7. In January, Van Exel went down with a knee injury missing 18 games, and was replaced with second-year guard Derek Fisher as the team's starting point guard for the remainder of the season. The Lakers held a 34–11 record at the All-Star break, and won 22 of their final 25 games to tie the Pacific Division title with the Seattle SuperSonics with a 61–21 record. It was the Lakers' best record since the 1989–90 season.

O'Neal averaged 28.3 points, 11.4 rebounds and 2.4 blocks per game, and was named to the All-NBA First Team, and also finished in fourth place in Most Valuable Player voting. In addition, Jones averaged 16.9 points and 2.0 steals per game, and was named to the NBA All-Defensive Second Team, while Van Exel provided the team with 13.8 points and 6.9 assists per game, and Fox contributed 12.0 points per game. Robert Horry averaged 7.4 points, 7.5 rebounds, 1.6 steals and 1.3 blocks per game, while Elden Campbell provided with 10.1 points, 5.6 rebounds and 1.3 blocks per game off the bench, and Fisher contributed 5.8 points and 4.1 assists per game.

In the playoffs, the Lakers defeated the Portland Trail Blazers, 3–1 in the Western Conference First Round for the second consecutive year, then after losing Game 1 of the Western Conference Semi-finals to the 2nd–seeded SuperSonics, 106–92 at Seattle, the Lakers would win the next four games, thus the series. However, in the Western Conference Finals, they were swept by the top-seeded Utah Jazz in four straight games. The Jazz would go on to lose in six games to the Chicago Bulls in the NBA Finals for the second straight year.

Following the season, Van Exel was traded to the Denver Nuggets after feuding with head coach Del Harris, and Barry signed as a free agent with the Sacramento Kings.

Draft picks

Roster

Regular season

Season standings

Record vs. opponents

Game log

Regular season

|- style="background:#cfc;"
| 1
| October 31
| Utah
| W 104-87
| Kobe Bryant (23)
| Robert Horry (13)
| Horry & Van Exel (7)
| Great Western Forum16,234
| 1-0

|- style="background:#cfc;"
| 2
| November 4
| @ Sacramento
| W 101-98
| Eddie Jones (35)
| Corie Blount (7)
| Nick Van Exel (6)
| ARCO Arena17,317
| 2-0
|- style="background:#cfc;"
| 3
| November 7
| New York
| W 99-94
| Horry & O'Neal (17)
| Robert Horry (10)
| Nick Van Exel (6)
| Great Western Forum17,505
| 3-0
|- style="background:#cfc;"
| 4
| November 9
| Golden State
| W 132-97
| Shaquille O'Neal (27)
| Shaquille O'Neal (19)
| Derek Fisher (10)
| Great Western Forum14,623
| 4-0
|- style="background:#cfc;"
| 5
| November 11
| @ Dallas
| W 118-96
| Shaquille O'Neal (37)
| Shaquille O'Neal (12)
| Robert Horry (9)
| Reunion Arena13,722
| 5-0
|- style="background:#cfc;"
| 6
| November 13
| @ San Antonio
| W 109-100 (OT)
| Shaquille O'Neal (34)
| Shaquille O'Neal (15)
| Eddie Jones (7)
| Alamodome20,557
| 6-0
|- style="background:#cfc;"
| 7
| November 14
| @ Houston
| W 113-103 (2OT)
| Nick Van Exel (35)
| Shaquille O'Neal (13)
| Shaquille O'Neal (8)
| Compaq Center16,285
| 7-0
|- style="background:#cfc;"
| 8
| November 16
| Vancouver
| W 121-95
| Eddie Jones (28)
| Robert Horry (12)
| Nick Van Exel (8)
| Great Western Forum17,139
| 8-0
|- style="background:#cfc;"
| 9
| November 18
| @ Utah
| W 97-92
| Bryant & Van Exel (19)
| Shaquille O'Neal (9)
| Nick Van Exel (5)
| Delta Center19,911
| 9-0
|- style="background:#cfc;"
| 10
| November 19
| Minnesota
| W 118-93
| Eddie Jones (31)
| Shaquille O'Neal (12)
| Derek Fisher (9)
| Great Western Forum17,505
| 10-0
|- style="background:#cfc;"
| 11
| November 23
| L.A. Clippers
| W 119-102
| Eddie Jones (28)
| Corie Blount (9)
| Nick Van Exel (11)
| Great Western Forum17,505
| 11-0
|- style="background:#fcc;"
| 12
| November 25
| @ Miami
| L 86-103
| Nick Van Exel (21)
| 3 players tied (7)
| Eddie Jones (6)
| Miami Arena15,200
| 11-1
|- style="background:#cfc;"
| 13
| November 26
| @ Boston
| W 118-103
| Elden Campbell (22)
| Robert Horry (9)
| Nick Van Exel (9)
| Fleet Center18,624
| 12-1
|- style="background:#fcc;"
| 14
| November 28
| @ Philadelphia
| L 95-105
| Bryant & Campbell (19)
| Robert Horry (9)
| Nick Van Exel (6)
| CoreStates Center20,714
| 12-2
|- style="background:#cfc;"
| 15
| November 30
| Toronto
| W 105-99
| Eddie Jones (32)
| Blount & Horry (8)
| Nick Van Exel (10)
| Great Western Forum14,940
| 13-2

|- style="background:#cfc;"
| 16
| December 3
| @ Denver
| W 107-89
| Elden Campbell (25)
| Elden Campbell (12)
| Kobe Bryant (5)
| McNichols Sports Arena14,503
| 14-2
|- style="background:#cfc;"
| 17
| December 5
| San Antonio
| W 98-88
| Nick Van Exel (25)
| Corie Blount (10)
| Nick Van Exel (6)
| Great Western Forum17,505
| 15-2
|- style="background:#fcc;"
| 18
| December 7
| Cleveland
| L 84-94
| Kobe Bryant (21)
| Robert Horry (10)
| Nick Van Exel (4)
| Great Western Forum16,945
| 15-3
|- style="background:#fcc;"
| 19
| December 8
| @ Portland
| L 99-105
| Nick Van Exel (24)
| Elden Campbell (12)
| Nick Van Exel (12)
| Rose Garden20,721
| 15-4
|- style="background:#fcc;"
| 20
| December 10
| @ Golden State
| L 92-93
| Kobe Bryant (20)
| Elden Campbell (9)
| Nick Van Exel (8)
| The Arena in Oakland13,414
| 15-5
|- style="background:#cfc;"
| 21
| December 12
| Houston
| W 119-102
| Rick Fox (30)
| Robert Horry (8)
| Nick Van Exel (8)
| Great Western Forum17,505
| 16-5
|- style="background:#cfc;"
| 22
| December 14
| Dallas
| W 119-89
| Kobe Bryant (30)
| Elden Campbell (8)
| Fisher & Van Exel (7)
| Great Western Forum15,893
| 17-5
|- style="background:#cfc;"
| 23
| December 16
| @ Minnesota
| W 109-96
| Eddie Jones (32)
| 4 players tied (6)
| Nick Van Exel (14)
| Target Center16,874
| 18-5
|- style="background:#fcc;"
| 24
| December 17
| @ Chicago
| L 83-104
| Kobe Bryant (33)
| Robert Horry (6)
| Nick Van Exel (5)
| United Center24,119
| 18-6
|- style="background:#cfc;"
| 25
| December 19
| @ Atlanta
| W 98-98
| Kobe Bryant (19)
| Robert Horry (8)
| Nick Van Exel (7)
| Georgia Dome25,288
| 19-6
|- style="background:#cfc;"
| 26
| December 20
| @ Charlotte
| W 109-100
| Nick Van Exel (24)
| Corie Blount (11)
| Nick Van Exel (8)
| Charlotte Coliseum24,042
| 20-6
|- style="background:#cfc;"
| 27
| December 22
| @ Houston
| W 94-83
| Kobe Bryant (19)
| Elden Campbell (14)
| Nick Van Exel (10)
| Compaq Center16,285
| 21-6
|- style="background:#cfc;"
| 28
| December 26
| L.A. Clippers
| W 118-114 (OT)
| Nick Van Exel (30)
| Elden Campbell (11)
| Nick Van Exel (12)
| Great Western Forum17,505
| 22-6
|- style="background:#fcc;"
| 29
| December 28
| Boston
| L 102-108
| Rick Fox (27)
| 3 players tied (9)
| Nick Van Exel (10)
| Great Western Forum17,505
| 22-7
|- style="background:#cfc;"
| 30
| December 30
| Sacramento
| W 93-80
| Elden Campbell (23)
| Elden Campbell (9)
| Nick Van Exel (11)
| Great Western Forum16,283
| 23-7

|- style="background:#cfc;"
| 31
| January 2
| Atlanta
| W 116-106
| Eddie Jones (23)
| Shaquille O'Neal (9)
| Nick Van Exel (13)
| Great Western Forum17,505
| 24-7
|- style="background:#fcc;"
| 32
| January 4
| Philadelphia
| L 107-113
| Shaquille O'Neal (26)
| Shaquille O'Neal (16)
| Nick Van Exel (9)
| Great Western Forum17,505
| 24-8
|- style="background:#cfc;"
| 33
| January 6
| @ Vancouver
| W 100-87
| Shaquille O'Neal (25)
| Shaquille O'Neal (14)
| Nick Van Exel (7)
| General Motors Place15,837
| 25-8
|- style="background:#cfc;"
| 34
| January 7
| Milwaukee
| W 114-102
| Shaquille O'Neal (38)
| Horry & O'Neal (9)
| Nick Van Exel (18)
| Great Western Forum15,483
| 26-8
|- style="background:#cfc;"
| 35
| January 9
| @ L.A. Clippers
| W 125-115
| Shaquille O'Neal (32)
| Elden Campbell (10)
| Nick Van Exel (5)
| Los Angeles Memorial Sports Arena16,067
| 27-8
|- style="background:#fcc;"
| 36
| January 11
| Charlotte
| L 93-98
| Shaquille O'Neal (32)
| Shaquille O'Neal (13)
| Eddie Jones (7)
| Great Western Forum17,505
| 27-9
|- style="background:#cfc;"
| 37
| January 14
| Denver
| W 132-114
| Shaquille O'Neal (34)
| Shaquille O'Neal (10)
| Derek Fisher (13)
| Great Western Forum15,067
| 28-9
|- style="background:#cfc;"
| 38
| January 17
| Miami
| W 108-99
| Shaquille O'Neal (24)
| Shaquille O'Neal (14)
| Nick Van Exel (4)
| Great Western Forum17,505
| 29-9
|- style="background:#cfc;"
| 39
| January 19
| Orlando
| W 92-89
| Shaquille O'Neal (35)
| Shaquille O'Neal (15)
| Robert Horry (7)
| Great Western Forum17,505
| 30-9
|- style="background:#cfc;"
| 40
| January 21
| @ Phoenix
| W 119-109
| Shaquille O'Neal (26)
| Shaquille O'Neal (11)
| Nick Van Exel (6)
| American West Arena19,023
| 31-9
|- style="background:#fcc;"
| 41
| January 24
| @ Seattle
| L 95-101
| Shaquille O'Neal (30)
| Shaquille O'Neal (12)
| Nick Van Exel (8)
| KeyArena17,072
| 31-10
|- style="background:#fcc;"
| 42
| January 28
| New Jersey
| L 95-106
| Shaquille O'Neal (27)
| Shaquille O'Neal (19)
| Nick Van Exel (8)
| Great Western Forum15,643
| 31-11
|- style="background:#cfc;"
| 43
| January 30
| Minnesota
| W 121-114
| Rick Fox (30)
| Shaquille O'Neal (17)
| Derek Fisher (9)
| Great Western Forum17,505
| 32-11

|- style="background:#cfc;"
| 44
| February 1
| Chicago
| W 112-87
| Rick Fox (25)
| Corie Blount (13)
| Blount & Fisher (7)
| Great Western Forum17,505
| 33-11
|- style="background:#cfc;"
| 45
| February 4
| Portland
| W 122-115
| Eddie Jones (28)
| Shaquille O'Neal (10)
| Nick Van Exel (11)
| Great Western Forum15,389
| 34-11
|- align="center"
|colspan="9" bgcolor="#bbcaff"|All-Star Break
|- style="background:#cfc;"
|- bgcolor="#bbffbb"
|- style="background:#fcc;"
| 46
| February 10
| @ Portland
| L 105-117
| Shaquille O'Neal (31)
| Shaquille O'Neal (12)
| Barry & Fox (6)
| Rose Garden21,538
| 34-12
|- style="background:#cfc;"
| 47
| February 11
| Golden State
| W 105-99
| Shaquille O'Neal (33)
| Shaquille O'Neal (10)
| Nick Van Exel (14)
| Great Western Forum14,674
| 35-12
|- style="background:#fcc;"
| 48
| February 13
| Seattle
| L 108-113 (OT)
| Shaquille O'Neal (44)
| Robert Horry (14)
| Eddie Jones (7)
| Great Western Forum17,505
| 35-13
|- style="background:#fcc;"
| 49
| February 15
| Houston
| L 88-90
| 3 players tied (18)
| Shaquille O'Neal (13)
| Nick Van Exel (9)
| Great Western Forum17,505
| 35-14
|- style="background:#fcc;"
| 50
| February 18
| @ Phoenix
| L 103-110
| Shaquille O'Neal (30)
| Shaquille O'Neal (10)
| Derek Fisher (5)
| American West Arena19,023
| 35-15
|- style="background:#cfc;"
| 51
| February 19
| Denver
| W 131-92
| Rick Fox (22)
| Mario Bennett (13)
| Kobe Bryant (7)
| Great Western Forum15,159
| 36-15
|- style="background:#fcc;"
| 52
| February 22
| @ Orlando
| L 94-96
| Shaquille O'Neal (20)
| Shaquille O'Neal (10)
| Fisher & Fox (5)
| Orlando Arena17,238
| 36-16
|- style="background:#cfc;"
| 53
| February 24
| @ Milwaukee
| W 98-81
| Shaquille O'Neal (21)
| Shaquille O'Neal (12)
| Derek Fisher (6)
| Bradley Center18,717
| 37-16
|- style="background:#cfc;"
| 54
| February 25
| @ Indiana
| W 96-89
| Shaquille O'Neal (24)
| Horry & O'Neal (9)
| Derek Fisher (6)
| Market Square Arena16,726
| 38-16
|- style="background:#cfc;"
| 55
| February 27
| @ Minnesota
| W 104-91
| Shaquille O'Neal (35)
| Robert Horry (8)
| Derek Fisher (8)
| Target Center20,197
| 39-16

|- style="background:#fcc;"
| 56
| March 1
| @ New York
| L 89-101
| Shaquille O'Neal (19)
| Robert Horry (12)
| Shaquille O'Neal (5)
| Madison Square Garden19,763
| 39-17
|- style="background:#fcc;"
| 57
| March 2
| @ Washington
| L 86-96
| Shaquille O'Neal (28)
| Shaquille O'Neal (15)
| Derek Fisher (10)
| MCI Center20,674
| 39-18
|- style="background:#cfc;"
| 58
| March 4
| Indiana
| W 104-95
| Shaquille O'Neal (29)
| Shaquille O'Neal (12)
| Derek Fisher (7)
| Great Western Forum17,505
| 40-18
|- style="background:#cfc;"
| 59
| March 6
| San Antonio
| W 91-84
| Shaquille O'Neal (23)
| Elden Campbell (7)
| Fisher & Fox (5)
| Great Western Forum17,505
| 41-18
|- style="background:#cfc;"
| 60
| March 8
| Detroit
| W 96-89
| Shaquille O'Neal (32)
| Shaquille O'Neal (13)
| Derek Fisher (11)
| Great Western Forum17,505
| 42-18
|- style="background:#cfc;"
| 61
| March 11
| Portland
| W 121-107
| Shaquille O'Neal (33)
| Elden Campbell (11)
| Derek Fisher (10)
| Great Western Forum16,758
| 43-18
|- style="background:#cfc;"
| 62
| March 12
| @ L.A. Clippers
| W 108-85
| Shaquille O'Neal (32)
| Robert Horry (14)
| Rick Fox (5)
| Arrowhead Pond18,521
| 44-18
|- style="background:#cfc;"
| 63
| March 15
| @ Vancouver
| W 119-110
| Shaquille O'Neal (24)
| Robert Horry (13)
| 3 players tied (6)
| General Motors Place18,983
| 45-18
|- style="background:#fcc;"
| 64
| March 16
| @ Seattle
| L 89-101
| Shaquille O'Neal (25)
| Shaquille O'Neal (8)
| Fox & Jones (4)
| KeyArena17,072
| 45-19
|- style="background:#cfc;"
| 65
| March 18
| Phoenix
| W 99-93
| Shaquille O'Neal (33)
| Shaquille O'Neal (22)
| Nick Van Exel (7)
| Great Western Forum17,505
| 46-19
|- style="background:#cfc;"
| 66
| March 20
| Seattle
| W 93-80
| Shaquille O'Neal (24)
| Shaquille O'Neal (16)
| Rick Fox (7)
| Great Western Forum17,505
| 47-19
|- style="background:#cfc;"
| 67
| March 22
| @ Sacramento
| W 96-93
| Shaquille O'Neal (33)
| Robert Horry (14)
| Nick Van Exel (5)
| ARCO Arena17,317
| 48-19
|- style="background:#cfc;"
| 68
| March 23
| @ Denver
| W 107-86
| Eddie Jones (27)
| Shaquille O'Neal (9)
| Nick Van Exel (6)
| McNichols Sports Arena17,171
| 49-19
|- style="background:#cfc;"
| 69
| March 25
| Sacramento
| W 114-91
| Shaquille O'Neal (25)
| Shaquille O'Neal (14)
| Nick Van Exel (6)
| Great Western Forum16,634
| 50-19
|- style="background:#fcc;"
| 70
| March 28
| @ Utah
| L 91-106
| Shaquille O'Neal (31)
| Robert Horry (7)
| Nick Van Exel (6)
| Delta Center19,911
| 50-20
|- style="background:#cfc;"
| 71
| March 29
| Washington
| W 116-89
| Shaquille O'Neal (33)
| Shaquille O'Neal (13)
| Derek Fisher (9)
| Great Western Forum17,505
| 51-20
|- style="background:#cfc;"
| 72
| March 31
| @ Toronto
| W 114-105
| Rick Fox (31)
| Shaquille O'Neal (13)
| Derek Fisher (7)
| Maple Leaf Gardens16,086
| 52-20

|- style="background:#cfc;"
| 73
| April 2
| @ New Jersey
| W 117-106
| Shaquille O'Neal (50)
| Robert Horry (10)
| Nick Van Exel (6)
| Continental Airlines Arena20,049
| 53-20
|- style="background:#cfc;"
| 74
| April 3
| @ Cleveland
| W 105-93
| Shaquille O'Neal (26)
| Shaquille O'Neal (11)
| Nick Van Exel (6)
| Gund Arena20,562
| 54-20
|- style="background:#cfc;"
| 75
| April 5
| @ Detroit
| W 105-103 (OT)
| Shaquille O'Neal (35)
| Shaquille O'Neal (12)
| Nick Van Exel (4)
| The Palace of Auburn Hills22,076
| 55-20
|- style="background:#cfc;"
| 76
| April 8
| Vancouver
| W 113-102
| Shaquille O'Neal (30)
| Corie Blount (15)
| Nick Van Exel (6)
| Great Western Forum17,505
| 56-20
|- style="background:#fcc;"
| 77
| April 10
| Phoenix
| L 105-114
| Shaquille O'Neal (24)
| Mario Bennett (14)
| Fox & Van Exel (7)
| Great Western Forum17,505
| 56-21
|- style="background:#cfc;"
| 78
| April 11
| @ Golden State
| W 96-84
| Shaquille O'Neal (35)
| Shaquille O'Neal (15)
| Rick Fox (6)
| The Arena in Oakland19,821
| 57-21
|- style="background:#cfc;"
| 79
| April 13
| @ San Antonio
| W 99-75
| Shaquille O'Neal (28)
| Shaquille O'Neal (16)
| Derek Fisher (6)
| Alamodome26,783
| 58-21
|- style="background:#cfc;"
| 80
| April 14
| @ Dallas
| W 111-95
| Shaquille O'Neal (34)
| Robert Horry (13)
| Derek Fisher (9)
| Reunion Arena18,107
| 59-21
|- style="background:#cfc;"
| 81
| April 17
| Dallas
| W 124-95
| Shaquille O'Neal (43)
| Robert Horry (10)
| Derek Fisher (10)
| Great Western Forum17,505
| 60-21
|- style="background:#cfc;"
| 82
| April 19
| Utah
| W 102-98
| Shaquille O'Neal (33)
| Shaquille O'Neal (15)
| Nick Van Exel (7)
| Great Western Forum17,505
| 61-21

Playoffs

|- style="background:#cfc;"
| 1
| April 24
| Portland
| W 104–102
| Shaquille O'Neal (30)
| Jones & O'Neal  (7)
| Robert Horry (5)
| Great Western Forum17,505
| 1–0
|- style="background:#cfc;"
| 2
| April 26
| Portland
| W 108–99
| Rick Fox (24)
| Shaquille O'Neal (9)
| Derek Fisher (7)
| Great Western Forum17,505
| 2–0
|- style="background:#fcc;"
| 3
| April 28
| @ Portland
| L 94–99
| Shaquille O'Neal (36)
| Shaquille O'Neal (16)
| Robert Horry (7)
| Rose Garden21,558
| 2–1
|- style="background:#cfc;"
| 4
| April 30
| @ Portland
| W 110–99
| Shaquille O'Neal (31)
| Shaquille O'Neal (15)
| Nick Van Exel (7)
| Rose Garden21,558
| 3–1
|-

|- style="background:#fcc;"
| 1
| May 4
| @ Seattle
| L 92–106
| Shaquille O'Neal (27)
| Shaquille O'Neal (11)
| Rick Fox (10)
| KeyArena17,072
| 0–1
|- style="background:#cfc;"
| 2
| May 6
| @ Seattle
| W 92–68
| Shaquille O'Neal (26)
| Horry & O'Neal (10)
| Derek Fisher (7)
| KeyArena17,072
| 1–1
|- style="background:#cfc;"
| 3
| May 8
| Seattle
| W 119–103
| Shaquille O'Neal (30)
| Shaquille O'Neal (10)
| Derek Fisher (7)
| Great Western Forum17,505
| 2–1
|- style="background:#cfc;"
| 4
| May 10
| Seattle
| W 112–100
| Shaquille O'Neal (39)
| Shaquille O'Neal (8)
| O'Neal & Van Exel (7)
| Great Western Forum17,505
| 3–1
|- style="background:#cfc;"
| 5
| May 12
| @ Seattle
| W 110–95
| Shaquille O'Neal (31)
| Robert Horry (11)
| Derek Fisher (6)
| KeyArena17,072
| 4–1
|-

|- style="background:#fcc;"
| 1
| May 16
| @ Utah
| L 77–112
| Shaquille O'Neal (19)
| Corie Blount (9)
| Nick Van Exel (3)
| Delta Center19,911
| 0–1
|- style="background:#fcc;"
| 2
| May 18
| @ Utah
| L 95–99
| Shaquille O'Neal (31)
| Corie Blount (10)
| Rick Fox (7)
| Delta Center19,911
| 0–2
|- style="background:#fcc;"
| 3
| May 22
| Utah
| L 98–109
| Shaquille O'Neal (39)
| Shaquille O'Neal (15)
| Nick Van Exel (7)
| Great Western Forum17,505
| 0–3
|- style="background:#fcc;"
| 4
| May 24
| Utah
| L 92–96
| Shaquille O'Neal (38)
| Robert Horry (8)
| Eddie Jones (6)
| Great Western Forum17,505
| 0–4
|-

Player statistics

NOTE: Please write the players statistics in alphabetical order by last name.

Regular season

Playoffs

Awards and records

Awards
 Shaquille O'Neal was named to the All-NBA First Team
 Eddie Jones was named to the NBA All-Defensive Second Team

All-Star
 Kobe Bryant was selected to his first NBA All-Star Game.
 Eddie Jones was selected to his second NBA All-Star Game.
 Nick Van Exel was selected to his first NBA All-Star Game.
 Shaquille O'Neal was selected to his sixth NBA All-Star Game.

Weekly and monthly
 Shaquille O'Neal was named NBA Player of the Week for games played from November 9 through November 15.
 Eddie Jones was named NBA Player of the Month for November.
 Shaquille O'Neal was named NBA Player of the Month for January.
 Shaquille O'Neal was named NBA Player of the Week for games played from March 15 to March 21.
 Shaquille O'Neal was named NBA Player of the Month for April.
 Del Harris was named NBA Coach of the Month for April.

Transactions

References

External links
 Lakers on Database Basketball
 Lakers on Basketball Reference

Los Angeles Lakers seasons
Los Angle
Los Angle
Los Angle